Case is an unincorporated community in northern Laclede County, in the U.S. state of Missouri. The community was on Missouri Route E approximately 1.5 miles northwest of Eldridge.

History
A post office called Case was established in 1861, and remained in operation until 1876. The community was named after John Case, a pioneer citizen.

References

Unincorporated communities in Laclede County, Missouri
Unincorporated communities in Missouri